The Green Hornet  is an American comic book series published by Dynamite Entertainment that premiered in 2010 and ran until 2013. The first four-issue story arc of the series was written by writer/director Kevin Smith. The book's story is based on the unused script Smith had written for a Green Hornet feature film.

Production
The idea of a Green Hornet film written by writer/director Kevin Smith had been in the works since 2004 but never came to fruition. The script was acquired by Dynamite Entertainment and made into an ongoing Green Hornet comic book series. The first issue was published with a March 2010 cover date. Smith wrote the first ten issues.

Smith subsequently wrote another comic book, Batman '66 Meets the Green Hornet which featured the Adam West version of Batman teaming up with the Green Hornet. That series premiered in 2014, and lasted twelve issues.

Reception
At the review aggregator website Comic Book Roundup, the first issue of the series has a rating of 6.9 out of 10, based on five reviews. The subsequent three issues that Smith wrote having ratings ranging from 6.6 to 7.2. His latter two issues, 8 and 10, have ratings of 9 and 7, respectively. The series overall, which lasted for 35 issues under various creative teams, has a rating of 7.1. Among those who wrote positive reviews of the first issue were Andy Bently of IGN and David Pepose, George Marston, and Lan Pitts of Newsarama.

References

2010 comics debuts
Dynamite Entertainment titles
Green Hornet
Comics by Kevin Smith